The Auckland urban route network consists of strategic and primary arterial roads across the Auckland Region of New Zealand. Urban routes are signposted with white shields. To avoid conflict with state highway numbering, there are no urban routes numbered 1, 2, 16, 18, 20, or 22.

Urban routes
This is a list of current and proposed urban route roads in Auckland.

See also 
List of motorways, expressways, and highways in Auckland

Roads in New Zealand
Transport in Auckland